Richard "Ric" O'Barry (born Richard Barry O'Feldman; October 14, 1939) is an American animal rights activist and former animal trainer who was first recognized in the 1960s for capturing and training the five dolphins that were used in the TV series Flipper. O'Barry transitioned from training dolphins to instead advocating against industries that keep dolphins in captivity, after one of the Flipper dolphins died. In 1996, a dolphin was seized from the Sugarloaf Dolphin Sanctuary, a corporation O'Barry worked for, for violating the Animal Welfare Act of 1966. In 1999, O'Barry was fined for violating the Marine Mammal Protection Act as the result of illegally releasing two dolphins that were not able to survive in the wild. The dolphins sustained life-threatening injuries.

In 1970, O'Barry founded the Dolphin Project, a group that aims to educate the public about captivity and, where feasible, free captive dolphins. He was featured in the Academy Award-winning film The Cove (2009), which used covert techniques to expose the yearly dolphin drive hunting that goes on in Taiji, Japan.

Flipper
Richard O'Barry started out capturing and training dolphins for the Miami Seaquarium and through the 1960s became the head trainer for the five dolphins who collectively played Flipper on the popular American TV show, while also serving as stunt double for show cast member Luke Halpin. When, in early 1970, a few years after production of Flipper had ended, Kathy, the dolphin who most often played Flipper, did not resurface for air, O'Barry considered the possibility that she had committed suicide and concluded that capturing, displaying, and training dolphins to perform tricks is wrong.

Activism

On Earth Day in 1970 he founded Dolphin Project, an organization dedicated to educating the public about the plight of dolphins in captivity. He also pioneered work to demonstrate rehabilitation and release as a viable alternative for captive dolphins. O’Barry has since released over twenty-five captive dolphins in Haiti, Colombia, Guatemala, Nicaragua, Brazil, The Bahamas and the United States.

For the last 40 plus years O’Barry has spoken about the harmful effects of captivity on dolphins at lectures and conferences around the world. In 1991 in recognition of his contribution to the protection of dolphins, O’Barry received an Environmental Achievement Award, presented by the US Committee for the United Nations Environmental Program. In 2007, Ric and Helene O’Barry became consultants for the Earth Island Institute's International Marine Mammal Project.

O'Barry resigned from his position at the Earth Island Institute in September 2014, due to disagreements with its management regarding the acceptance of funds from the tuna industry, and its use of Fish Aggregation Devices.

Working with Ric O'Barry's Dolphin Project, he leads an international effort to stop the killing of dolphins, end the trafficking in live dolphins to theme parks and captive swim-with-the-dolphins attractions and continues to lecture and speak out against the captivity industry.
     
O’Barry is co-author of three books, Behind the Dolphin Smile, To Free a Dolphin (both with Keith Colbourne) and most recently Die Bucht about dolphins and the making of The Cove published in Germany with Hans Peter Roth.  Richard O’Barry is a Fellow National in the Explorers Club.

O’Barry lives in Coconut Grove, Florida, US.  O’Barry is Founder and is Director of the non-profit organization, Ric O'Barry's Dolphin Project Inc.

In 2018, O’Barry was noted in the book, Rescuing Ladybugs  by author and animal advocate Jennifer Skiff as “the man leading the global fight to protect dolphins” after being moved to action after witnessing the death of a dolphin named Kathy who he had trained while employed by the Miami Seaquarium.

Violation of the Marine Mammal Protection Act
In 1996, O'Barry and Lloyd A. Good, III, working on behalf of Sugarloaf Dolphin Sanctuary and The Dolphin Project, violated the Marine Mammal Protection Act, a federal law that prohibits harassment of marine mammals. O'Barry violated federal law by releasing two dolphins that formerly participated in the U.S. Navy's marine mammal training program without properly preparing them for life in the wild. The dolphins, "Luther" and "Buck", were illegally transported without a permit from the U.S. Navy facility in San Diego, California to Key West, Florida despite their lack of skills that O'Barry and Good acknowledged were necessary for survival. As a result of this, Buck and Luther sustained life-threatening injuries and were found emaciated, begging for food, with deep laceration wounds by biologists from the National Oceanic and Atmospheric Administration and required capture to nurse them back to health.

O'Barry and Good were found guilty and charged civil penalties of $59,500 in 1999.

The Cove

O'Barry was featured in the Academy Award-winning feature-length documentary The Cove, directed by Louie Psihoyos which investigates links between the killing, capture, trade and display of dolphins all over the world. The 2009 film centers on Taiji, Wakayama, Japan, drawing attention to the hunt of about 2,000 dolphins taking place there every year.
O’Barry and his son Lincoln O'Barry are also behind the Blood Dolphin$ TV show for Discovery's Animal Planet, which continues on where The Cove left off.

References

External links
The Cove
Ric O'Barry's Dolphin Project

"Review of The Cove"

American animal rights activists
Animal trainers
American environmentalists
Living people
People from Miami
United States Navy sailors
1939 births